Statistics of Swedish football Division 3 for the 1947–48 season.

League standings

Norra 1947–48

Östra 1947–48

Västra 1947–48

Södra 1947–48

Footnotes

References 

Swedish Football Division 3 seasons
3
Swed